Fortum Waste Solutions Oy (formerly Ekokem) is a Finnish company that provides recycling and waste management services for industries, cities, and communities. Fortum Waste Solutions is part of Fortum Corporation. Fortum Waste Solutions covers a network of over 30 offices in Finland, Sweden, and Denmark.

In 2014, the Organisation for the Prohibition of Chemical Weapons (OPCW) selected Fortum Waste Solutions as one of the companies to incinerate wastes produced in destruction of Syria's chemical weapons.

See also 
List of Finnish government enterprises

References

Waste management companies of Finland
1979 establishments in Finland
Government-owned companies of Finland
Riihimäki
Waste companies established in 1979
Waste Solutions